Bruguiera is a plant genus in the family Rhizophoraceae.  It is a small genus of five mangrove species and three hybrids of the Indian and west Pacific Ocean region, its range extending from East Africa and Madagascar through coastal India, Sri Lanka and Southeast Asia to northern Australia, Melanesia and Polynesia.  It is characterised by calyces with 8-16 lanceolate, pointed lobes, 16-32 stamens, explosive release of pollen, and viviparous propagules.  It is named in honour of French explorer and biologist Jean Guillaume Bruguière (1750–1798). Recently, the eighth taxa of Bruguiera, B. × dungarra (a previously undescribed hybrid species between B. exaristata and B. gymnorhiza) was recognised as occurring in northern Australia.

List of species

 Bruguiera cylindrica (L.) Blume 
 Bruguiera caryophyllaeoides (J.F.Gmel.) Blume synonym of Bruguiera cylindrica (L.) Blume 
 Bruguiera caryophylloides (Burm. f.) Blume synonym of Bruguiera cylindrica (L.) Blume 
 Bruguiera malabarica Arn. synonym of Bruguiera cylindrica (L.) Blume 
 Bruguiera exaristata Ding Hou 
 Bruguiera gymnorhiza (L.) Lam. 
 Bruguiera capensis Blume synonym of Bruguiera gymnorhiza (L.) Lam. 
 Bruguiera conjugata (L.) Merr. synonym of Bruguiera gymnorhiza (L.) Lam. 
 Bruguiera conjugata f. alba Stone synonym of Bruguiera gymnorhiza (L.) Lam. 
 Bruguiera gymnorhiza f. alba (Stone) Fosberg synonym of Bruguiera gymnorhiza (L.) Lam. 
 Bruguiera gymnorhiza var. palun Blume synonym of Bruguiera gymnorhiza (L.) Lam. 
 Bruguiera rhedii Tul. synonym of Bruguiera gymnorhiza (L.) Lam. 
 Bruguiera rheedei Blume synonym of Bruguiera gymnorhiza (L.) Lam. 
 Bruguiera rumphii Blume synonym of Bruguiera gymnorhiza (L.) Lam. 
 Bruguiera wightii Blume synonym of Bruguiera gymnorhiza (L.) Lam. 
 Bruguiera zippelii Blume synonym of Bruguiera gymnorhiza (L.) Lam. 
 Bruguiera zippelii var. oblongifolia Blume synonym of Bruguiera gymnorhiza (L.) Lam. 
 Bruguiera parviflora (Roxb.) Wight & Arn. ex Griff. 
 Bruguiera parviflora Wight (Unresolved) 
 Bruguiera ritchiei Merr. synonym of Bruguiera parviflora (Roxb.) Wight & Arn. ex Griff. 
 Bruguiera sexangula (Lour.) Poir. 
 Bruguiera sexangula var. rhynchopetala W.C.Ko (Unresolved) 
 Bruguiera × rhynchopetala (W.C.Ko) N.C.Duke & X.J.Ge (Unresolved) 
 Bruguiera sexangula var. sexangula synonym of Bruguiera sexangula (Lour.) Poir. 
 Bruguiera australis A.Cunn. ex Arn. synonym of Bruguiera sexangula (Lour.) Poir. 
 Bruguiera eriopetala Wight & Arn. synonym of Bruguiera sexangula (Lour.) Poir. 
 Bruguiera oxyphylla Miq. synonym of Bruguiera sexangula (Lour.) Poir. 
 Bruguiera parietosa Griff. synonym of Bruguiera sexangula (Lour.) Poir.

Hybrids 

 Bruguiera hainesii C.G.Rogers. 
 Bruguiera × rhynchopetala (W.C.Ko) N.C.Duke & X.J.Ge.
 Bruiguiera × dungarra.

Other Bruguiera species synonyms (unresolved or for other genera):

 Bruguiera arnottiana Wight ex Arn. synonym of Ceriops tagal (Perr.) C.B.Rob. 
 Bruguiera candel Steud. synonym of Kandelia rheedii Wight & Arn. 
 Bruguiera decandra Griff. synonym of Ceriops decandra (Griff.) W.Theob. 
 Bruguiera decangulata Griff. synonym of Rhizophora mangle L. 
 Bruguiera timoriensis Wight & Arn. synonym of Ceriops tagal (Perr.) C.B.Rob. 
 Bruguiera littorea Steud. synonym of Lumnitzera littorea (Jack) Voigt 
 Bruguiera madagascariensis DC. (Unresolved) 
 Bruguiera nemorosa Blanco (Unresolved) 
 Bruguiera obtusa Steud. (Unresolved)

See also 
Mangroves

References

External links

Bruguiera gymnorrhiza (large-leafed mangrove)

 
Malpighiales genera
Mangroves